Jackson Township is one of the twelve townships of Sandusky County, Ohio, United States.  As of the 2000 census, 1,609 people lived in the township, 1,297 of whom lived in the unincorporated portions of the township.

Geography
Located in the southwestern part of the county, it borders the following townships:
Washington Township - north
Sandusky Township - northeast corner
Ballville Township - east
Pleasant Township, Seneca County - southeast corner
Liberty Township, Seneca County - south
Jackson Township, Seneca County - southwest corner
Scott Township - west
Madison Township - northwest corner

Several communities are located in Jackson Township:
The village of Burgoon, in the south
Part of the village of Helena, in the northwest
The unincorporated community of Millersville, in the northwest
The unincorporated community of Havens

Name and history
Jackson Township was organized in 1829. It was named for Andrew Jackson, who was President at that time.

It is one of thirty-seven Jackson Townships statewide.

Government
The township is governed by a three-member board of trustees, who are elected in November of odd-numbered years to a four-year term beginning on the following January 1. Two are elected in the year after the presidential election and one is elected in the year before it. There is also an elected township fiscal officer, who serves a four-year term beginning on April 1 of the year after the election, which is held in November of the year before the presidential election. Vacancies in the fiscal officership or on the board of trustees are filled by the remaining trustees.

References

External links
County website

Townships in Sandusky County, Ohio
Townships in Ohio